The 1996 Regal Welsh Open was a professional ranking snooker tournament that took place between 27 January–3 February 1996 at the Newport Leisure Centre in Newport, Wales.

Steve Davis was the defending champion, but lost in the third round to Drew Henry.

Mark Williams defeated John Parrott 9–3 in the final to win his first ranking title. 


Main draw

References

Welsh Open (snooker)
1996 in snooker
1990s in Cardiff
Welsh